Lisa Ulrika Gunnarsson (born 20 August 1999) is a Swedish athlete who specialises in the pole vault. Her personal bests in the event, 4.50 metres outdoors and 4.55 indoors, are both World youth best performances (under 18). Gunnarsson finished sixth at the 2017 European Indoor Championships in Belgrade and has won two French Championship titles.

Biography
Born in Stockholm, Sweden, Gunnarsson has only lived in Sweden for about three years, having spent most of her life abroad due to her father's professional assignments. She has lived in Sweden (twice), Argentina, Luxembourg (twice), France (twice) and since 2018 the United States.

Gunnarsson started out as a very promising gymnast and was a member of the Swedish junior national team. At the time of the Summer Olympics in London she was practicing gymnastics for thirty hours a week. But as she watched her big role model in the sport, Jonna Adlerteg, finish 39th in the games' all-around competition she told her mother, Ulrika: “I’m not training this much just to finish 39th at the Olympics. I want to win gold!" That was when she decided not to invest any more time in gymnastics. In her final competition representing the French club, Angers Gymnastique, Gunnarsson won the individual all-around title in the category “National B 13” at the French National Championships held in Troyes 4–6 May 2012. She scored 13.833 on the vault, 10.633 on the uneven bars, 9.466 on the balance beam and 12.466 on the floor exercise. Her total score for all four events was 46.398 points.

Gunnarsson took up athletics at the age of 12, after she had moved to Paris, France with her parents. She first tried pole vaulting in the spring of 2013 and, despite injuring herself after a fall during her second practice, she decided to give it another try. That turned out to be the right decision. Gunnarsson had a natural talent for pole vaulting and cleared 2.40 metres in her very first competition on 27 April. Just 50 days later she had improved her personal best to 3.42. When asked what she thinks is the key to her rapid improvement in the event, Gunnarsson answered that she is very grateful of her gymnastics background which has provided her with the strength and flexibility required for pole vaulting. Gunnarsson has previously attended a school in Nantes, but in October 2016 she decided to move back to Paris, to be closer to her parents who live there. In 2016, Gunnarsson attended INSEP, a national training institute for elite athletes, where she was coached by Alain Donias. She has competed for the French athletics club Stade Français, as well as the Swedish club Hässelby SK. In 2018, she competed for Virginia Tech as a college freshman. As of 2019, she competes for Louisiana State University.

NCAA

Competition record

References

External links
 

1999 births
Living people
Swedish female pole vaulters
Virginia Tech Hokies track and field athletes
Louisiana State University alumni
LSU Lady Tigers track and field athletes
Athletes from Stockholm
20th-century Swedish women
21st-century Swedish women